Futbol Club Barcelona Femení, commonly referred to as Barça Femení, is a Spanish professional women's football team based in Barcelona, Catalonia. It's the women's football section of FC Barcelona and it competes in the Primera División, the top tier of Spanish women's football.

Formed in 1970 by 18-year-old Immaculada "Imma" Cabecerán with the name Peña Femenina Barcelonista, but without belonging to FC Barcelona, the Peña Femenina Barcelonista was an establishing member of Spain's first recognized women's league, the Primera División (founded as the Liga Nacional). Later Peña Femenina Barcelonistas was named as Club Femení Barcelona. Although being closely associated with the club for decades, the team was not established as an official section of FC Barcelona until 2002, when the club definitively incorporated Club Femení Barcelona into its sports structure. Through battles with promotion and relegation, the club won their first league title in 2011.

Domestically, Barcelona Femení has won a record 18 trophies: 7 Primera División, 9 Copas de la Reina, and two Spanish Supercups titles, as well as being the record holder for all those competitions, converting it the most successful club in Spanish women's football. Since the club's professionalization in 2015, Barcelona has become Spain's most successful team in the UEFA Women's Champions League. They were the first Spanish club to reach a quarterfinal of the Champions League, the first to reach a semifinal of the Champions League, the first to make it to a Champions League Final, and the first to win it, which they did in 2021. By winning the Champions League, FC Barcelona became the first club to win a Champions League title for both its men and women's footballing sections and they became the first Spanish women's team to complete a continental treble by winning the 2020–21 Copa de la Reina.

Barcelona Femení plays its home games at Johan Cruyff Stadium in Sant Joan Despí, and occasionally at the Camp Nou.

FC Barcelona Femení belongs to one of the four professional football clubs in Spain whose legal entity is not that of a sports corporation (SAD), as its ownership rests with its memberships, called socis. Barcelona, along with Athletic Club, Real Madrid, and Madrid CFF are also the only clubs in the league not part of Spain's Association of Women's Football Clubs (ACFF).

History

1970–2002: Beginnings 
One morning in November 1970, 18-year-old Catalan amateur footballer Immaculada "Imma" Cabecerán Soler met with former FC Barcelona president Agustí Montal Costa to discuss the formation of a women's team associated with the club.

On 17 November 1970, in a way akin to Joan Gamper, Cabecerán posted a print advertisement in an FC Barcelona fan magazine called La Revista Barcelonista. She called for women between the ages 18-25 to play in an exhibition match the following month at the Camp Nou. The team came to fruition and was formed of 17 individuals- Maria Antònia Mínguez, Llera, Giménez, Pilar Gazulla, Lluïsa Vilaseca, Aurora Arnau, Anna Jaques, Maite Rodríguez, Immaculada Cabecerán, Núria Llansà, Alicia Estivill, Blanca Fernández, Lolita Ortiz, Consuelo Pérez, Carme Nieto, Fina Ros and Glòria Comas- all of whom were all trained by Barcelona legends Antoni Ramallets and César Rodríguez, although the latter left after a few days. The team played their first match on Christmas Day, 1970, winning on penalties against Unió Esportiva Centelles in front of a crowd of around 60,000 people.

The match, played under the name Selección Ciudad de Barcelona, was a charity match organised by Ràdio Nacional to raise funds for local children's hospitals. Although the team was not officially recognized by the club, it was the first match played by a women's team associated with FC Barcelona (then known as CF Barcelona). The team later evolved into Penya Femenina Barça, and Ramallets coached them until 1972.

During the 1980s, the team was renamed Club Femení Barcelona. They reached an informal integration agreement with FC Barcelona where they were allowed to use the colors, badges and facilities of the club, but it took a few more years to adopt the crest. On 29 June, 1985, the team won its first competition- the Generalitat Cup.

In 1988, Club Femení Barcelona, which was sponsored by FC Barcelona, was a founding member of the Liga Nacional (now known as the Primera División), the first women's league recognized by the RFEF. They had a successful 3-year run in the early 1990s, winning the 1994 Copa de la Reina and being the championship's runner-up in 1992 and 1994, but they subsequently declined to bottom table positions.

2002–2007: Becoming an official section of FC Barcelona and battling relegation 
In 2001, the Spanish League was rebranded into the Superliga Femenina, but Barcelona were not accepted into the top division due to their poor results in the previous season. On 26 June, 2002, CF Barcelona was incorporated to FC Barcelona as an official section, and the club rebranded the women's section to its Catalan name, Futbol Club Barcelona Femení. 

Barcelona remained in the second division after two unsuccessful appearances in the promotion playoffs, but was eventually promoted to the Superliga Femenina in 2004. Once promoted, the section enjoyed some popularity in the 2004-05 season due to the signing of the Mexican international Maribel Domínguez and the Spanish María Luisa Coimbra,  but those signings did not translate into quality results for the team. Xavi Llorens was hired as manager in 2006 to replace Natalia Astrain, but Llorens was unable to keep the section in the Superliga. At the end of the 2006-07 season, the team was relegated from the Superliga and the club even considered dissolving the section.

2007–2015: First league title wins and debut in the UEFA Women's Champions League 

Barcelona returned to the Superliga in 2008, and between 2009 and 2011, they consolidated themselves in top positions in the league table. In 2011, they won their second Spanish Cup, beating local rival Espanyol 1–0 in the final. In 2012, they won their first national championship with a then-record 94 points, qualifying for the first time for the UEFA Champions League where they were defeated by Arsenal in the first round. The title was successfully defended in 2013 with a last matchday away win over leading team Athletic Bilbao, and weeks later they also won the national cup with a 4–0 win over Prainsa Zaragoza to become the fifth team to win the Spanish double.

Barcelona qualified for the quarterfinals of the Women's Champions League for the first time in the 2013–14 edition, a season in which they won their third straight title. In the following 2014–15 season, they became the first team in the Spanish women's league to win four straight league titles.

2015–2019: Professionalization and reaching new heights in the Champions League 
In the summer of 2015, the club made the decision to professionalize the women's section. In the seasons that followed, Barcelona placed a greater priority on competing in the UEFA Women's Champions League. The club reached their first Women's Champions League semifinal in the 2016-17 season, and also defeated Atlético Madrid Femenino in the 2017 Copa de la Reina. 

In the summer of 2017, the women's team underwent significant changes. Xavi Llorens stepped down as coach after eleven seasons, in which he won six Copas Catalunya, four Copas de la Reina and four league titles. The club hired Fran Sánchez in his place, and that summer signed multiple big names in international football- namely Lieke Martens, Toni Duggan, and Élise Bussaglia, amongst others. In the 2018-19 season, Barcelona signed a shirt sponsor deal with Stanley Tools, the first shirt sponsor specific to the women's team. 

Around this same time period, Barcelona forged a domestic rivalry with Atlético Madrid Femenino. Atlético won 3 league titles between the 2016-17 and 2018-19 seasons, and Barcelona were runners-up in each of those seasons. On 17 March, 2019, Barcelona defeated Atlético at the Wanda Metropolitano in a match that broke the world record for attendance at a women's club football match with 60,739 attendees. Months later, the club reached the second Women's Champions League semifinal of their history in a tie against Bayern Munich, which they won 2-0 on aggregate to advance to their first ever UEFA Women's Champions League Final. They met five-time Champions League winners Olympique Lyonnais Féminin, who defeated them 4-1 in Budapest to capture their fourth-consecutive and sixth overall Champions League title.

2019–present: Winning their first Champions League title and completing the treble 
In the summer following their Champions League Final defeat, the club signed Caroline Graham Hansen from Wolfsburg and re-signed one of the clubs all-time top scorers Jenni Hermoso, who spent the previous season with Atletico Madrid. On 9 February 2020, Barcelona won the inaugural Supercopa de España when they defeated Real Sociedad 10–1 in the final. On 8 May, Barcelona were crowned league champions for the fifth time during which they were unbeaten in the 21 games they had played, before the season prematurely ended in January due to the COVID-19 pandemic in Spain. On 25 August, Barcelona were defeated 0–1 by VfL Wolfsburg in the single-legged semifinal of the UEFA Women's Champions League, a disappointing downgrade from their previous season.

On 6 January, 2021, just weeks after the 50th anniversary of the team's formation, Barcelona played the first professional match at the Camp Nou between women's teams, winning 5–0 against rivals Espanyol. The following month, Barcelona defeated Logroño 3–0 in the final of the 2020 Copa de la Reina after it was postponed from 31 May 2020, due to the COVID-19 pandemic. This was the club's seventh Copa de la Reina title, surpassing Espanyol's six wins to become the team with the most all-time Copa de la Reina titles. On 9 May, Barcelona were crowned league champions for an unprecedented sixth time after second-place Levante drew 1–1 to Espanyol. They achieved this while they had a perfect record in the league, winning all 26 of their games. 

On 16 May 2021, Barcelona won the UEFA Women's Champions League title for the first time after they beat Chelsea 4–0 in the final in Gothenburg, with all four goals coming within the first 36 minutes of the match. In doing so, Barcelona became the first ever club to have been European champions in both men's and women's football. It was also the largest margin of victory in any UEFA Women's Champions League final. On 31 May, Barcelona defeated Levante 4–2 in the Copa de la Reina final to win the trophy for the eighth time, becoming the first-ever Spanish women's side (fifth overall) to win the European continental treble. The club also set an unprecedented milestone of both the men's and women's sections of a European club completing a treble. Amidst this success, Barcelona announced manager Lluís Cortés was set to stay for two more years. Weeks later, reports emerged that the players had called for Cortés to be sacked, citing the need to refresh and start over. In response, Cortés admitted that a change was indeed necessary, but maintained the rumours were unfounded.

On 1 June 2021, just two days after the Copa de la Reina Final, Barcelona suffered their only league defeat of the season as they lost 3–4 to rivals Atlético Madrid. On 27 June, ahead of Barcelona's 9–1 thrashing of Eibar in their final league game of the season, Cortés announced that he would leave Barcelona following that game amidst reported unrest within the team. They finished their season with a record 33 league wins and a record 99 points in the league.

On 2 July 2021, Cortés' assistant coach Jonatan Giráldez was appointed as the new manager of Barcelona following Cortés' exit. During preseason for the 2021-22 season, Barcelona won the inaugural Women's Joan Gamper Trophy after they defeated Juventus 6-0.

The 2021-22 season brought success on a similar scale to the 2020-21 season. The club entered mid-season with zero losses in all competitions, going undefeated both in the league and in the group stages of the Champions League. In November, Barcelona captain Alexia Putellas was awarded the Ballon d'Or, the first FCB Femeni player to achieve the honor. On 23 January 2022, Barcelona defeated Atlético Madrid 7-0 in the final to win their second Supercopa de España. In doing so, Barcelona completed the quadruple of the league, the Copa de la Reina, the UEFA Women's Champions League and the Supercup. Less than two months later, on 13 March 2022, they were again crowned Primera División champions after beating Real Madrid 5-0, with six games to spare.  This was their seventh title; Grant Wahl called the side one of the best women's club teams in history.

In the 2021–22 Champions League knockout rounds, Barcelona beat Real Madrid 8–3 on aggregate and Wolfsburg 5–3 on aggregate. Barcelona's home quarter- and semi-finals (91,553 and 91,648) were the largest known attendances for women's football matches since 1971, Mexico–Denmark (110,000), at the Azteca Stadium. In the Champions League final, however, Barcelona were defeated 3–1 by Lyon.

Barça Women rounded off a historic Spanish league campaign in 2021/22 season. Jonatan Giráldez's team picked up 90 points out of a possible 90, 30 wins in 30 matches. With 159 goals scored, Barça Women averaged 5.3 goals per game. In 30 matches, Barça Women conceded just 11 goals, just 0.36 per match. Finally, Jonatan Giráldez's team were league champions, winners of the Copa de la Reina and the Spanish Super Cup (Domestic treble), as well as being runners up to Lyon in the Champions League.

The summer of 2022 brought about a large shift in Barcelona's squad with four major player departures – the club's all-time top scorer Jenni Hermoso left to Mexican club Pachuca, the club's longest-serving player and appearances leader Melanie Serrano retired to pursue a youth coaching position within the club, Lieke Martens left to Paris Saint-Germain, and Leila Ouahabi left to Manchester City. The club then brought in the services of 2021–22 Pichichi winner Geyse Ferreira, 2020 FIFA The Best winner Lucy Bronze, Nuria Rábano, and young stars Salma Paralluello, and Vicky López.

On transfer deadline day – 7 September 2022, Barcelona broke the world record for a transfer fee in women's football when they signed English midfielder Keira Walsh from Manchester City for €470,000 in a three year deal.

Players

Current squad

From Reserve team

Out on loan

Current technical staff

Former internationals 

  Spain: Sonia Bermúdez, Raquel Cabezón, Marta Corredera, Marta Cubí, Ana Escribano, Andrea Falcón, Carolina Férez, Alicia Fuentes, Olga García, Ruth García, Gemma Gili, Jenni Hermoso, Bárbara Latorre, Vicky Losada, Adriana Martín, Olga Moreno, Melisa Nicolau, Leila Ouahabi, Andrea Pereira, "Willy" Romero, Roser Serra, Melanie Serrano, Esther Sullastres, Montserrat Tomé, Virginia Torrecilla, María Paz Vilas
  Argentina: Ludmila Manicler, Florencia Quiñones
  Brazil: Andressa Alves, Fabiana Simões, Gio Queiroz
  Denmark: Line Røddik Hansen
  England: Toni Duggan
  France: Élise Bussaglia, Kheira Hamraoui
  Mexico: Maribel Domínguez, Patricia Pérez, Kenti Robles, Pamela Tajonar
  Netherlands: Stefanie van der Gragt, Lieke Martens
  North Macedonia: Nataša Andonova
  Portugal: Andreia Norton
  Romania: Simona Vintilă
  Serbia: Jelena Čanković

Transfers

Seasons

Record in UEFA Women's Champions League 

All results (away, home and aggregate) list FC Barcelona's goal tally first.

Honours

Domestic 
Primera División (7, record):  2011–12, 2012–13, 2013–14, 2014–15,  2019–20, 2020–21, 2021–22  
Copa de la Reina (9, record):  1994, 2011, 2013, 2014, 2017, 2018, 2019–20, 2020–21, 2021–22
Supercopa de España (3, record):  2019–20, 2021–22, 2022–23
Copa Catalunya (10, record):  2009, 2010, 2011, 2012, 2014, 2015, 2016, 2017, 2018, 2019

International 
UEFA Women's Champions League (1): 2020–21

Invitational 
COTIF Women's Football Tournament
Winners: 2014

Teide Trophy
Winners: 2022

Women's International Champions Cup
Third Place: 2021

AMOS Women's French Cup  
Third Place: 2022

Others 

 Guinness world record for most consecutive victories in all competitions: 45 wins during the 2021–22 season (from 6 June 2021 to 30 April 2022).

See also 
 Athletic–Barcelona rivalry
 Women's Derbi barceloní
 El Clásico women matches

References

External links 

 

 
FC Barcelona
Women's football clubs in Spain
1988 establishments in Catalonia
Football clubs in Barcelona
Primera División (women) clubs